Travel requirements for Polish citizens are public health and administrative entry restrictions by the authorities of other states placed on citizens of Poland.

Visa requirements 
As of January 2023, Polish citizens had visa-free or visa on arrival access to 184 countries and territories, ranking the Polish passport 9th in terms of travel freedom (tied with the passport of Hungary, according to the Henley Passport Index.

Visa requirements map

List of countries

List of territories, disputed areas or restricted zones
Visa requirements for Polish citizens for visits to various territories, disputed areas, partially recognized countries and restricted zones:

Vaccination requirements

Vaccination requirements map

Certain countries and territories require travellers arriving from Poland to be vaccinated against specific diseases. This is a map of vaccination requirements for Polish citizens and residents arriving directly from the Schengen area, excluding those arriving from third countries.

Quadrivalent meningococcal vaccination (ACYW135)

Polio vaccination

Yellow fever vaccination

COVID-19 vaccination
Many countries increasingly consider the vaccination status of travellers with regard to quarantine requirements or when deciding to allow them entry at all. This is justified by research that shows that the Pfizer vaccine effect lasts for six months or so.

Passport requirements

Passport not required
Polish identity card is valid for these countries :
 and Europe (except Belarus, Russia, the United Kingdom [for tourism] and Ukraine)
 French overseas territories

 (de facto)

 (individuals with pre-settled or settled status, frontier-worker permit or are a Swiss service provider can continue using national identity cards)

Blank passport pages

Passport validity length

Medical passport

Many African countries, including  Benin, Burkina Faso, Burundi, Cameroon, Central African Republic,  Democratic Republic of the Congo, Republic of the Congo, Côte d'Ivoire,  Gabon,   Guinea-Bissau, Kenya, Liberia,  Niger, Rwanda,  Sierra Leone and Togo,  require  incoming passengers older than nine months to one year to have a current International Certificate of Vaccination or Prophylaxis, as does the South American territory of French Guiana.

Entry bans

Criminal record

Persona non grata

Israeli stamps

Biometrics

Right to consular protection in non-EU countries
In a non-EU country where there is no Polish embassy, Polish citizens, like all other EU citizens, have the right to get consular protection from the embassy of any other EU country present in that country.

See also List of diplomatic missions of Poland.

See also

Visa policy of the Schengen Area
Polish identity card
Polish passport

Annotations, References and Notes

Annotations

References

Notes

Foreign relations of Poland
Poland